This is a list of wars involving the Kingdom of Norway in some capacity, both the modern polity and its predecessor states.

List

Unification of Norway (860–872)

Kingdom of Norway (872–1397)

Kalmar Union (1397–1523)

Denmark–Norway (1523–1814)

Kingdom of Norway (1814–present)

References

 
Norway
Wars
Wars